This is a list of years in Norway.

Independent monarchy of Norway (1905–present) 
Years in Norway since the dissolution of the union between Norway and Sweden was declared in 1905.

Norway during the union with Sweden (1814–1905) 
This is a list of years in Norway during the Union between Sweden and Norway.

Norway during the Kalmar Union and the union with Denmark (1397–1814) 
This is a list of years in Norway during the Kalmar Union (1397–1523) and the Union between Denmark and Norway (1536/1537–1814).

Norway during the High Middle Ages (1066–1397) 
This is a list of years in Norway during the High Middle Ages.

Norway during the Viking Age (800–1066) 
This is a list of years in Norway during the Viking Age.

See also
 History of Norway
 Timeline of Bergen
 Timeline of Oslo
 List of years by country

Further reading

External links
 

Norway history-related lists
 
Norway